In mathematics, in the field of homological algebra, the Grothendieck spectral sequence, introduced by Alexander Grothendieck in his Tôhoku paper, is a  spectral sequence that computes the derived functors of the composition of two functors , from knowledge of the derived functors of  and .
Many spectral sequences in algebraic geometry are instances of the Grothendieck spectral sequence, for example the Leray spectral sequence.

Statement 

Five term exact sequence 
The exact sequence of low degrees reads

Examples

The Leray spectral sequence 

For a continuous map  there is the (left-exact) direct image functor .
We also have the global section functors

 and 
Then since  and the functors  and  satisfy the hypotheses (since the direct image functor has an exact left adjoint , pushforwards of injectives are injective and in particular acyclic for the global section functor), the sequence in this case becomes:

Local-to-global Ext spectral sequence 
There is a spectral sequence relating the global Ext and the sheaf Ext: let F, G be sheaves of modules over a ringed space ; e.g., a scheme. Then

This is an instance of the Grothendieck spectral sequence: indeed,
Moreover,  sends injective -modules to flasque sheaves, which are -acyclic. Hence, the hypothesis is satisfied.

Derivation 
We shall use the following lemma:

We have

which splits. This implies each  is injective. Next we look at

It splits, which implies the first part of the lemma, as well as the exactness of

Similarly we have (using the earlier splitting):

The second part now follows. 

We now construct a spectral sequence.

Hence, we found an injective resolution of the complex:

such that each row  satisfies the hypothesis of the lemma (cf. the Cartan–Eilenberg resolution.)

Now, the double complex  gives rise to two spectral sequences, horizontal and vertical, which we are now going to examine. On the one hand, by definition,
,
which is always zero unless q = 0 since  is G-acyclic by hypothesis. On the other hand, by the definition and the lemma,

Since  and  have the same limiting term, the proof is complete.

Notes

References

Computational Examples 

 Sharpe, Eric (2003). Lectures on D-branes and Sheaves (pages 18–19), 

Spectral sequences